Saint Mark's College is a bilingual school in Monte Grande, part of Greater Buenos Aires, Argentina.

Its staff provides instruction in both English and Spanish and the school offers education at the kindergarten, elementary and secondary levels. It offers the International Baccalaureate program. The school was founded in 1958 by two sisters Poupeé and Emilia Marteletti, and by Susana Raquel Raffo.  
Its motto is "Dominus Regit Me" which translates to "The Lord is my Guide". The school features three houses which are named in honour of Wilkie Collins, Sir Walter Scott and John Milton.

References

External links
 St. Mark's College
 St. Mark's College New Site
 Colegio San Marcos IB site

International Baccalaureate schools in Argentina
Bilingual schools
Education in Buenos Aires Province
Educational institutions established in 1958
1958 establishments in Argentina